Peter Grosz is an American actor and television writer. He is most recognizable for appearing in Sonic Drive-In's "Two Guys" commercials, in which he appears as the straight man in a double act with improvisational comedian T. J. Jagodowski until it was replaced by families in 2020.

Early life and education
Grosz was born in New York City, and was raised in Scarsdale, New York. Grosz is Jewish. He attended Northwestern University, graduating in 1996. One of his college roommates during that time was fellow actor Seth Meyers.

Career 
From 2002 to 2012 and 2014 on, Grosz has starred as one half of the "Two Guys" for the Sonic Drive-In commercials alongside fellow improviser T. J. Jagodowski. In 2020, it was reported that Sonic's commercials would be going in a different direction, but that the "Two Guys" series would continue to be part of the chain's advertising in some way. Lori Abou Habib, Sonic's Chief Marketing Officer, said that the commercials are "a huge part of our voice, and they’ll be part of our brand going forward." The two actors also appeared together in the 2006 film Stranger Than Fiction.

Grosz worked as a writer for The Colbert Report from 2007 to 2010, where he has appeared on screen at least four times: once as the Time-Travelling Brandy Thief, once as a version of himself on September 23, 2008, once on May 13, 2010, to interrupt Stephen Colbert's attempt to introduce guest band The Hold Steady, only to perform the introduction himself, and on January 9, 2013, as McGnaw the Gluten-Free Beaver. In addition, the May 13, 2010 episode ended with Colbert wishing farewell to the Time-Travelling Brandy Thief; Grosz confirmed on his Facebook page that this was his last episode of the Report as a writer. Additionally, the birth of his child was announced on the show on March 9, 2009.

Grosz joined the writing staff of Late Night with Seth Meyers in 2014.

Grosz recurred on the HBO comedy series Veep, playing callous oil lobbyist Sidney Purcell over four of the first five seasons. He also played Mike Pence on The President Show.

On December 18, 2018, Grosz appeared on The Late Show with Stephen Colbert as Stephen Miller, Senior Advisor for policy to US President Donald Trump, in a sketch with Colbert about Miller's appearance on Face the Nation the previous Sunday.

Grosz has also routinely appears as a panelist and has been a guest host on the NPR show Wait Wait... Don't Tell Me!.

Filmography

Acting

Film

Television

Writing

References

External links 

Living people
American male film actors
Male actors from New York City
American Jews
American people of Hungarian-Jewish descent
Primetime Emmy Award winners
American male television actors
21st-century American male actors
Northwestern University School of Communication alumni
Television producers from New York City
American television writers
American male television writers
Scarsdale High School alumni
Upright Citizens Brigade Theater performers
Screenwriters from New York (state)
21st-century American comedians
Year of birth missing (living people)
21st-century American screenwriters
21st-century American male writers